Juan de Fuca was a provincial electoral district in British Columbia, Canada, that was represented between 2008 and 2017. It was established by the Electoral Districts Act, 2008.  It was first contested in the 2009 general election, in which New Democrat John Horgan was elected MLA.

Election history

References

Former provincial electoral districts of British Columbia on Vancouver Island